The 2013 Auto GP Series was the fourth year of the Auto GP series, and the fifteenth season of the former Euroseries 3000. The championship began on 23 March at Monza in Italy and finished on 6 October at Brno in the Czech Republic, after eight double-header rounds.

Teams and drivers

Race calendar and results
The provisional calendar for the 2013 season was released on 17 January 2013. But on 7 February 2013 was revealed that Moscow Raceway were dropped from schedule due to cost reasons. Silverstone Circuit will take Moscow Raceway's place in the calendar. On 24 April 2013, the calendar was altered again, with dropping Zandvoort due to clash with German GP2 Series and Formula One rounds and changing to Mugello Circuit.

Championship standings
 Points for both championships were awarded as follows:

In addition:
 One point will be awarded for Pole position for Race One
 One point will be awarded for fastest lap in each race

Drivers' standings

Teams' Championship

References

External links
Official Auto GP site 

Auto GP
Auto GP
Auto GP